Nicola Ferrari (born 15 July 1983) is an Italian footballer who currently plays as a forward for Crema.

Club career

Lumezzane and loans
Ferrari made his Serie B debut in a 4-0 win for Crotone over Piacenza on 4 September 2005.

AlbinoLeffe
Ferrari was signed by AlbinoLeffe on 4 July 2006 on a four-year contract for €550,000 transfer fee.

On 18 January 2010 AlbinoLeffe transferred Ferrari to Pergocrema for free.

Verona
Ferrari was signed by Verona in summer 2010.

In June 2012 he was provisionally suspended for 3 year due to 2011 Italian football scandal by a first level inquiry. His case was then under review and it was announced key witnesses will be heard by the sport judges of the Appeal Court. After defecting, it was demonstrated that he has not committed any fault at all and he was reinstated to Verona in January 2013. On 17 July 2013 he went to Spezia on a temporary deal; the following year he was transferred, outright, to Modena.

Modena
Ferrari joined Modena on 18 July 2014. He was assigned number 9 shirt.

Late career
On 31 August 2015 signed a contract for Lanciano. In the summer of 2016 he moved to Venezia.

9 August 2017 Ferrari was signed by Vicenza.

References

External links
 AIC profile (data by football.it) 
 U.C. AlbinoLeffe Official Player Profile 

1983 births
Living people
Sportspeople from Trentino
Italian footballers
Serie B players
Serie C players
F.C. Crotone players
U.C. AlbinoLeffe players
U.S. Pergolettese 1932 players
Hellas Verona F.C. players
Spezia Calcio players
Modena F.C. players
S.S. Virtus Lanciano 1924 players
Venezia F.C. players
L.R. Vicenza players
Association football forwards
Footballers from Trentino-Alto Adige/Südtirol